Bruce M. King was a psychologist and professor at Clemson University.

Early life and education
Bruce M. King went to a military-dependents high school in London, England, and received a B.A. in psychology from UCLA in 1969 and a Ph.D. in biopsychology from the University of Chicago in 1978.

Career
He taught at the University of New Orleans for 29 years and has been in the Department of Psychology at Clemson University since 2007.  Since 1981 he has taught human sexuality to over 60,000 students.  Professor King is senior author of Human Sexuality Today (9th ed., King & Regan, Pearson) and Statistical Reasoning in the Behavioral Sciences (7th ed., King, Rosopa, & Minium, John Wiley & Sons).  He has published nearly 90 research papers on obesity, human sexuality, and sexuality education.  Professor King is a Fellow in the American Psychological Association, Association for Psychological Science, and the International Behavioral Neuroscience Society, and is an honorary member of the Golden Key National Honor Society for excellence in teaching.

References

Year of birth missing (living people)
Living people
University of Chicago alumni
Sex educators
21st-century American psychologists